Elena Alexandrovna Kostioukovitch (born 1958 in Kyiv, USSR), is an essayist and literary translator. She is the winner of numerous literary awards, including the Best Translation of the Year in the USSR (1988), Zoil (1999), Grinzane Cavour Moscow (2004), Welcome Prize (2005) given by the Russian National Association of Restaurateurs, Bancarella (cucina) Award (2007, Italy), Chiavari Literary Prize (2007, Italy), and Premi Nazionali per la Traduzione (2008, Italy). Resides with her husband and two children in Milan, Italy.

Since 1988 Kostioukovich has worked as editor of a Russian series for Bompiani Publishers (RCS MediaGroup), and of a Russian series by Sperling&Kupfer and Frassinelli (Mondadori Group)(1996–2008), as well as a promoter of Russian culture in Italy and of Italian culture in Russia in various festivals and events like Mantua Book Festival, Cultural Days in Auditorium (Rome), Prima Vista Festival (Tartu, Estonia), Science Festival in Genoa, Montpellier Literary Festival, Babel Festival in Bellinzona, Non Fiction Book Fair in Moscow, Turin International Book Fair and Frankfurt Book Fair.

Bio 
Kostioukovitch’s interest in literature dates back to her childhood years. She is a granddaughter of the Russian writer and painter Leonid Volynski (Seven Days, Moscow 1956), and had access (first in Kyiv and later in Moscow) to artistic and literary circles; famous writers Viktor Nekrasov and Alexander Galich were among these who had a particular influence on young Elena.

At the age of 17 Kostioukovitch entered the M.V. Lomonosov Moscow State University, where she studied in the Philological Faculty in the Department of Italian Literature under the guidance of distinguished Prof. Galina Muravieva and of the Dean of the Russian Poetry and Translation Dept. Prof. Eugeny Solonovich. She graduated with honors from the University in 1980, Italian Seicento having been the focus of her degree, her thesis was devoted to L’Adone by Giovanbattista Marino, and her Ph.D. thesis to Italian Baroque Aesthetics. Between 1980 and 1988 she was a head of the Italian department of "Contemporary Foreign Fiction" magazine.

Translator and editor 
Her work as a scholar of Italian literature resulted in her translation of numerous books, including: Orlando Furioso by Ludovico Ariosto, Through the Lens of Aristotle by Emanuele Tesauro, and Scherzi by Giuseppe Giusti. She annotated the Russian Edition of "The Betrothed" by Alessandro Manzoni. She has also translated a number of modern Italian poets: Amelia Rosselli, Vittorio Magrelli, Pier Paolo Pasolini, Roberto Roversi, Rocco Scotellaro, Salvatore Quasimodo, Vittorio Sereni, etc. Her translations were included in the "Verses of the Century" anthology (Moscow, 1998).

In 1988 her translation of Umberto Eco’s The Name of the Rose made her famous overnight. Ever since its first publication the book has never been out of print (more than ten subsequent editions of the translation since it was first published). Later she translated other Umberto Eco’s novels (Foucault's Pendulum, The Island of the Day Before, Baudolino, The Mysterious Flame of Queen Loana, and others).

Between 1989 and 2008 she taught Russian Literature and Art of the Literary Translation first at Trento University, later at the University of Trieste and at the University of Milan.

Under her editorship various Anthologies were published: "Modern Russian Narrators selected by Elena Kostioukovitch" (Milan, Bompiani 1988), "The Roots of Russian Culture" by Dmitry Likhachov (Milan, Fratelli Fabbri Editori, 1991), "Jewish Stories and Tales" from a manuscript that was rescued from the KGB’s archives  (Milan, Bompiani, 2002), and "The Price of a Human Being" by Eufrosinia Kersnovskaya (Milan, Bompiani, 2009). She also authored numerous entries dedicated to Russian writers in the "Bompiani Dictionary of Works and Personalities" (Milan, Fratelli Fabbri Editori, 2004). She also edited "Five centuries of European drawings" (Leonardo Arte, Milan, 1995), "Treasures of Troya" (Leonardo Arte, Milan, 1996), and "The S.Petersburg Muraqqa", (Leonardo Arte, Milan, 1996).

Between 1993 and 2001 many of Elena's short stories were published by Panta Literary Magazine (Bompiani, Milan).

Her Print Journalism: Itoghi (Russia), Ezhenedel’nyj Zhurnal (Russia), Novaja Model (Russia), L’Espresso (Italy), Panorama (Italy), "Italia" (Italy/Russia).

Author 
In 2006, Kostioukovitch penned a book on the role of food in Italian culture, which explores the country’s history in depth: "Why Italians Love to Talk about Food" ("Perché agli Italiani piace parlare del cibo", Milan: Sperling & Kupfer, 2006). The book was also published in Russian as "Eda. Italianskoye Schastye" (Moscow, EKSMO, 2006). This book serves a gastronomic guide to the regions of Italy for the National Geographic office in Moscow and is widely consulted by Russian tourists who are eager to gain a deeper understanding of Italian history and culture. This title won the Premio Bancarella della Cucina award in 2007. The book has been translated and published in the following countries: United States - Farrar, Straus and Giroux, Australia (PICADOR - PAN MACMILLAN), Estonia (TANAPAEV), China (WEALTH PRESS, traditional Chenese), Korea (RANDOM HOUSE), Poland (ALBATROS), Serbia (PAIDEIA), Spain (TUSQUETS), UK - DUCKWORTH, Bulgaria - Avliga.

In 2013, Kostioukovitch's first novel ZWINGER was released in Russian by Corpus Books. The novel blends together the genres of historical novel and thriller, with a lively and ironic style. In the frame of a fictional detective story set during the 2005 Frankfurt Book Fair, the book investigates deeply into the real mysteries of the Twentieth century history through direct testimonies of the author, and precious documents of author's grandfather Leonid Rabinovich-Volynskij who was one of the "Monuments Men" of World War II, the head of Red Army investigation unit responsible for search of paintings from the Dresden Art Museum hidden by the Nazis.

ELKOST Literary Agency 
Elena Kostioukovitch introduced many new Russian authors to Italian and international reading community. Literary agency founded by Elena in 2000 handles world publishing rights for the most prominent Russian authors, such as Lyudmila Ulitskaya, Sasha Sokolov, Boris Akunin, Elena Rzhevskaya, Andrey Volos, Dina Rubina, Aleksandr Kabakov, Vladimir Kantor, Marina Vishnevetskaya, Leonid Yuzefovitch,  bestselling children's writer Grigory Oster, and many others. 
It also manages world publishing rights for the literary estates by Juri Lotman, Ilya Ehrenburg, Ilya Mitrofanov, and for Memorial society archival findings.

References

External links  
Personal webpage of Elena Kostioukovitch
ELKOST International Literary Agency webpage
 it Grinzane Cavour Moscow Prize
THE LITERARY TRANSLATION AS AN AESTHETIC INNOVATION
I niet che portarono al cambiamento - La Repubblica, 24/05/2012, in Italian

1958 births
Living people
Italian–Russian translators
Moscow State University alumni
Academic staff of the University of Milan
Russian translators
Russian women essayists
Russian writers in Italian
Writers from Kyiv
Russian food writers